Apsan Park is a large wilderness park located in the south of Daegu, South Korea. It covers a series of valleys and peaks of Apsan mountain.

Inside the park is a museum dedicated to the Korean War, the Nakdong River Battle Museum. The museum also contains an anti-communism  hall. Nearby is a small amusement park and restaurants. A gondola leads to one of the peaks, and a series of trails also lead to the various peaks.

Ansil-sa and a couple of other Buddhist temples are located within the park.

The area of Apsan park is 1.653 km².

See also
Environment of South Korea

External links
English-language profile
Official site, in Korean

Parks in Daegu
Nam District, Daegu
Dalseo District
Suseong District
Dalseong County